Modern pentathlon at the 2018 Asian Games was held at the APM Equestrian Center, Tigaraksa, Tangerang Regency, Banten, Indonesia. It was held from 31 August to 1 September 2018.

Modern pentathlon contained five events; pistol shooting, épée fencing,  freestyle swimming, show jumping, and a  cross-country run.

The first three events (fencing, swimming, and show jumping) were scored on a points system. Those points were then converted into a time handicap for the final combined event (pistol shooting and cross-country running), with the points leader starting first and each other competitor having a delayed start based on how many points behind the leader they were. This results in the finish order of the run being the final ranking for the event.

Schedule

Medalists

Medal table

Participating nations
A total of 28 athletes from 8 nations competed in modern pentathlon at the 2018 Asian Games:

References

External links
Modern pentathlon at the 2018 Asian Games
Official Result Book – Modern Pentathlon

 
2018
2018 Asian Games events
Asian Games
2018 Asian Games